Year 1168 (MCLXVIII) was a leap year starting on Monday (link will display the full calendar) of the Julian calendar.

Events

By place

Levant 
 Summer – King Amalric I of Jerusalem, and Byzantine emperor Manuel I (Komnenos), negotiate an alliance against Fatimid-Egypt. Archbishop William of Tyre is among the ambassadors sent to Constantinople, to finalize the treaty. 
 Autumn – William IV, count of Nevers, arrives in Palestine with a contingent of elite knights. In Jerusalem he is present during a council with Amalric and other nobles to decide on an expedition to Egypt.
 October 20 – Amalric I invades Egypt again from Ascalon, sacking Bilbeis and threatening Cairo. In November, a Crusader fleet sails up the Nile and arrives in Lake Manzala, sacking the town of Tanis.
 Nur al-Din, Zangid ruler (atabeg) of Aleppo, sends an expedition under General Shirkuh to Egypt on request of the Fatimid caliph Al-Adid. He offers him a third of the land, and fiefs for his generals.

Egypt 
 December 22 – Afraid that the Egyptian capital Fustat (modern-day Old Cairo) will be captured by Crusader forces, its Fatimid vizier, Shawar, orders the city set afire. The capital burns for 54 days.

Europe 
 March 27 – Patrick of Salisbury, Angevin governor of Poitou, is killed in an ambush at Poitiers by French forces under Guy of Lusignan. He is escorting Queen Eleanor of Aquitaine on a journey near the border of Aquitaine. Patrick's nephew, William Marshal, is part of the royal escort and is taken prisoner. Later he is ransomed and becomes a member of Eleanor's household.
 King Valdemar I (the Great) of Denmark conquers the Wendish capital at Arkona on the island of Rügen (modern Germany). The Wends become Christians and subject to Danish suzerainty.
 Henry the Lion, duke of Saxony, marries the 12-year-old Matilda (or Maud), daughter of King Henry II of England.
 The newly born Commune of Rome conquers and destroys the rival neighboring city of Albano (modern Italy).
 Stephen du Perche, Sicilian chancellor, is accused of plotting to claim the throne and is forced to flee.

Asia 
 April 9 – Emperor Rokujō is deposed by his grandfather, retired-Emperor Go-Shirakawa, after an 8-month reign. He is succeeded by his 6-year-old uncle, Takakura, as the 80th emperor of Japan.
 Yuanqu County (known as Wanting County) in China is destroyed by a flood of the Yellow River.

By topic

Religion 
 September 20 – Antipope Paschal III dies at Rome after a 4-year reign. Giovanni di Struma is elected as his successor and will reign as Antipope Callixtus III with support from Emperor Frederick I.
</onlyinclude>

Births 
 April 22 – Abubakar ibn Gussom, Arab poet (d. 1242)
 August 31 – Zhang Zong, Chinese emperor (d. 1208)
 November 19 – Ning Zong, Chinese emperor (d. 1224)
 Ibn Muti al-Zawawi, Arab jurist and philologian (d. 1231)
 Robert of Braybrooke, English High Sheriff (d. 1210)
 Robert of Courtenay, French nobleman and knight (d. 1239)
 Temüge (or Otgon), brother of Genghis Khan (d. 1246)
 William de Ferrers, 4th Earl of Derby (approximate date)

Deaths 
 January 17 – Thierry of Alsace, count of Flanders (b. 1099)
 March 27 – Patrick of Salisbury, Norman nobleman (b. 1122)
 April 5 – Robert de Beaumont, English nobleman (b. 1104)
 September 20 – Paschal III, antipope of Rome (b. 1110)
 October 24 – William IV, count of Auxerre and Nevers
 November 5 – Hugh IX (Lusignan), French nobleman
 Abu al-Najib Suhrawardi, Persian scholar (b. 1097)
 Bermudo Pérez de Traba, Spanish nobleman (b. 1088)
 Conrad of Babenberg, archbishop of Salzburg (b. 1115)
 Wivina, French Benedictine abbess and saint (b. 1103)

References